Ant & Dec's Limitless Win is a British game show hosted by Ant & Dec which premiered 8 January 2022 on ITV. The series was created by Hello Dolly Ltd and is produced by Hello Dolly Ltd and Ant & Dec's Mitre Studios.

Gameplay
Two contestants work together as a team to answer a series of questions with numerical solutions. In a preliminary round, they must answer as many questions as possible in 60 seconds, earning five "lives" for each correct response and incurring no penalty for a pass or miss. The contestants alternate turns; no conferring is allowed, and a contestant's turn only ends once they give a correct answer. If the team fails to answer any questions correctly, they are immediately dismissed with no winnings.

Examples of questions used in the preliminary round:

 How many odd numbers are there between zero and one hundred? (Answer: 50)
 The London Eye typically takes how many minutes to complete one full rotation? (Answer: 30)
 Which song about partying was Prince's first UK Top 40 hit? (Answer: "1999")

In the main game:

 On 21st June 2021, the longest day of the year, the Shetland Islands experienced the most hours of daylight in the UK. How many hours was that? (Answer: 19)
 The Natural History Museum's Dippy the Dinosaur, which went on a national tour in 2018, is how many metres long in its displayed pose? (Answer: 26)

The main game makes use of the "Limitless Ladder," a vertical scale marked off in steps and displaying cash values at each 10th step that increase from bottom to top. The team must use a dial to register their guess on each question, attempting to get as close to the correct answer as possible without going over. They move up the ladder a number of steps equal to their guess, and lose enough lives to match the error between the guess and the correct answer. The hosts warn the team when they have 30 seconds left to give an answer; if they fail to do so before time runs out, the last value they dialed is automatically locked in. If the team runs out of lives or offers a guess above the correct answer, the game ends and they leave with no winnings.

One lifeline at a time is made available for the team's use as the game proceeds; each may only be used once.

 More Than: Team may ask if the correct answer is higher than a value of their choice.
 Odd or Even: Team is told whether the correct answer is odd or even.
 Range: Team is shown a range in which the correct answer falls.
 Take Two: Team may offer two guesses, and the one closer to the correct answer without going over is counted. In series 2, this lifeline is altered slightly in that the team submits one answer, and then the hosts are allowed to submit their own answer. Again, only the answer closer to the correct one is counted.

If the team unlocks a new lifeline while holding an unused one, they may only keep one of the two and must discard the other.

If the team gives an exact answer, they receive five more lives and banked all the money they have earned. They can "cash out" on any question. The first 12 values displayed on the ladder are £500, £1,000, £2,500, £5,000, £10,000, £20,000, £30,000, £50,000, £75,000, £100,000, £150,000, and £250,000, and every 10 additional steps will increase the prize by a further £250,000. There is no upper limit to the potential top prize.

If the team has no lives, they will go into the "Sudden Death" mode, the team has to give an exact answer to stay in the game, but they also have the right to take the money.

If the team gets the question wrong, they will leave with nothing, just like in the "normal gameplay".

Reception
Stuart Heritage of The Guardian felt that Limitless Win was essentially Who Wants to Be a Millionaire? with "a few bells and whistles" (such as the idea of a "limitless" prize), and that the show suffered from pacing issues and "gratuitous complications" in its format. However, he praised Ant & Dec's hosting for their "perfectly weighted performance" in conducting the game, easily explaining the rules, and conversing with the contestants, and deemed it to be their "most effective new venture in probably two decades".

Michael Hogan of The Daily Telegraph ran with the headline "Ant & Dec's Limitless Win is the best gameshow since Who Wants to Be a Millionaire?". Michael argued that the programme was Ant & Dec's first new success after a string of previous "flops" (such as PokerFace, Push the Button, the American Wanna Bet? and Red or Black?), and not having been involved in a new format for a decade. He felt that "the game itself was a little fiddly but swept along in its propulsive momentum, viewers soon got the hang of it", and that the format felt "genuinely groundbreaking" in a "crowded" market for game shows.

Viewership
The series premiered to over 6.3 million viewers, making it ITV's highest-rated non-scripted series premiere since The Masked Singer. With average viewing figures of 4.7 million, it was the highest rated game show of 2022.

Series overview

International versions
On 1 March 2022, it was reported that Endemol Shine North America had acquired the US rights to the format, and was pitching it to local networks.

On 22 August 2022, RTL announced that they commissioned a German version of the show, Ohne Limit, to be produced by Endemol Shine Germany.

References

External links
 
 

Ant & Dec
2022 British television series debuts
2020s British game shows
ITV game shows
English-language television shows
Television series by Banijay